The First Woman Who Passes (Italian: La prima donna che passa) is a 1940 Italian historical comedy film directed by Max Neufeld and starring Alida Valli, Carlo Lombardi and Niní Gordini Cervi. The film is set in eighteenth century France. It was made at the Palatino Studios in Rome.

Cast
 Alida Valli as Gabrielle de Vervins 
 Carlo Lombardi as Il duca di Richelieu
 Niní Gordini Cervi as La marchesa de Prie
 Giuseppe Rinaldi as Raoul d'Aubigny  
 Lisa Varna as Marietta  
 Achille Majeroni as Il vescovo di Fleury  
 Olinto Cristina as Il conte di Vervins  
 Guglielmo Barnabò as Il console d'Auvray  
 Giuseppe Pierozzi as Il duca di Borbone
 Renato Malavasi as Andrea  
 Augusto Marcacci as Il governatore Delaroche  
 Emilio Petacci as Lagrange  
 Mario Giannini as Luigi XV
 Diana Lante as Madame Charolais 
 Eugenio Duse as Piccard

References

Bibliography 
 Gundle, Stephen. Mussolini's Dream Factory: Film Stardom in Fascist Italy. Berghahn Books, 2013.

External links 
 

1940 films
Italian historical drama films
Italian black-and-white films
1940 drama films
1940s historical drama films
1940s Italian-language films
Films directed by Max Neufeld
Films set in the 18th century
Films set in France
Films shot at Palatino Studios
1940s Italian films